Ahiara is a city in Mbaise, Imo State, Nigeria. The city stands about 16 miles between Owere and Umuahia. It was the location of Chukwuemeka Odumegwu Ojukwu's Ahiara Declaration during the Nigerian Civil War. It is the location of the Catholic diocese in Mbaise. The first recorded Ahiara contact with the Europeans was around 1905 when the British Aro expedition got mixed up in inter-village war which eventually had Dr. Steward a victim, as a consequence the Ahiara people were severely punished by the British forces with an invasion which forced many citizens to flee and never return.

The Ahiara Slogan is Decent Dexterity.

Origin

Ahiara was founded by a man of that name. He was the son of Anunu, popularly called Odo ji Anunu. His sibling Avuvu became a part of Ikeduru. Etymologically, the name Ahiara is a type of plant among the Igbo people. The leaves of this plant signify peace. The great Ezes of Igbo used to travel with Ahiara leaves to guarantee peaceful journeys across several territories. Before Christianity, which 89 percent of the people practice, traditional religion held sway. Ahiara does not practise a centralized system of government. The ten chief priests and chief priestess were the symbol of authority and they occasionally met to deliberate and pass motions which eventually became tradition and laws. They also conferred titles to deserving citizens. Among those was Hon Nze.H.C. O Uhegbu who was conferred with the title of Nze Onugotu of Ahiara as at the time he was the first man in Ahiara to represent the clan in the state legislature.

Ahiara Ofo Iri

Ahiara city is historically called Ahiara Ofo Iri, which means Ahiara of the Ten Scepters. Each scepter represents each of the ten villages that make up the city. The ten villages of Ahiara are:

Ahiara is divided into two sections: Ihite and Ikenga.

Ihite consists of these five villages: Obodo, Nnarambia, Oru na Nneude, Otulu, and Ogbe.
Ikenga consists of these five villages: Akabo, Amuzi, Agu na Eze, Ogwuama, and Ujichi.

These ten villages are symbolically explained as the ten fingers of the human hands. This signifies an evolved dexterity and is why the Ahiara Slogan is Decent Dexterity.

The Mater Ecclesiae Cathedral in Ahiara is the seat of the Roman Catholic Diocese of Ahiara.

References

Cities in Imo State